Ranulph is a masculine given name of Norman origin.

Ranulph is a composite name, from "Ran-," which comes from the Old Norse "rann" ("house") or Germanic "ragn" ("advice" or "power"), with "-ulf," from the Old Norse word "úlfr" ("wolf"), cognate with Danish "ulv," Icelandic "úlfur," Swedish "ulv," Norwegian "ulv," and Faroese "úlvur."

Famous people with the name Ranulph include:

Ranulph Bacon QPM (1906–1988), British police officer
Ranulph Brito or Le Breton (died 1246), canon of St. Paul's
Ranulph Crewe (1558–1646), English judge and Chief Justice of the King's Bench
Ranulph de Mortimer (bef. 1070 to c. 1104) of Mortemer-sur-Eaulne, a Marcher Lord from the Montgomery lands in the Welsh Marches
Ranulph Fiennes, OBE (born 1944), British adventurer and holder of several endurance records
Ranulph Glanville (born 1946), British freelance researcher and theoretician in both architecture and cybernetics
Robert Ranulph Marett (1866–1943), British ethnologist from Jersey
John Ranulph Vincent, Dean of Bloemfontein, in South Africa, from 1892, and afterwards of Grahamstown, 1912–1914

Notes

Masculine given names